Wai Ka-Fai (born 21 September 1962) is a Hong Kong screenwriter, producer, film director, and former TV screenwriter and producer.

Wai is best known for his frequent collaborations with Johnnie To, another former TV turned film director and producer. In 1996, they formed Milkyway Image, which is now one of the most successful independent film studios in Hong Kong. The films that the two have made together as directors and producers include Needing You..., Fat Choi Spirit, Love on a Diet, Fulltime Killer, Turn Left, Turn Right, Running on Karma, and Mad Detective. His solo directorial efforts include films such as Too Many Ways to Be No. 1 and Written By.

Two of his films were released in the US theatrically: Fulltime Killer and Mad Detective.

Filmography

Filmography as director
Peace Hotel 和平飯店 (1995)
Too Many Ways to Be No. 1 一個字頭的誕生 (1997)
Help!!! 辣手回春 (2000) (co-directed with Johnnie To)
Needing You... 孤男寡女 (2000) (co-directed with Johnnie To)
Wu yen 鍾無艷 (2001) (co-directed with Johnnie To)
Love on a Diet 瘦身男女 (2001) (co-directed with Johnnie To)
Fulltime Killer 全職殺手 (2001) (co-directed with Johnnie To)
Fat Choi Spirit 嚦咕嚦咕新年財 (2002) (co-directed with Johnnie To)
My Left Eye Sees Ghosts 我左眼見到鬼(2002) (co-directed with Johnnie To)
Love for All Seasons 百年好合 (2003) (co-directed with Johnnie To)
Turn Left, Turn Right 向左走向右走 (2003) (co-directed with Johnnie To)
Running on Karma 大隻佬 (2003) (co-directed with Johnnie To)
Fantasia 鬼馬狂想曲 (2004)
Himalaya Singh 喜馬拉亞星 (2005)
The Shopaholics 最愛女人購物狂 (2006)
Mad Detective 神探 (2007) (co-directed with Johnnie To)
Written By 再生號 (2009)
Don't Go Breaking My Heart 單身男女 (2011) (co-directed with Johnnie To)
Detective vs Sleuths 神探大戰 (2022)

Awards and nominations

References

External links

The Limits of Control, interview with Wai Ka-fai, MUBI

1962 births
Chinese television writers
Living people
Hong Kong film directors
Hong Kong film producers
Hong Kong screenwriters
Hong Kong television producers